The People of Hemsö is an 1887 novel by August Strindberg about the life of people of the island Hemsö in the Stockholm archipelago. Hemsö is a fictional island, but it is based on Kymmendö where Strindberg had spent time in his youth. Strindberg wrote the book to combat his homesickness while living abroad in Germany and France.

Written during a difficult period in exile from Sweden, the novel paradoxically has a strong sense of place, and is a feat of straightforward folksy storytelling. Mrs. Flod, a widow of some means, hires Carlsson to run the farm on the island. As a newcomer and a landlubber among sailors and fishermen, Carlsson is implicitly distrusted by the locals as they try to discern whether Carlsson is a slippery confidence trickster preying on the lonely widow, or an honest, hard-working man revitalizing the neglected farm.

The 1944 filmThe People of Hemsö was adapted from the novel. In 1955 a movie based on the novel was shown; it marked the first film appearance of the actress Daliah Lavi.

In 1966 a TV series based on the novel was produced.

Sources
 Meyer, Michael. 1985. Strindberg: A Biography. Oxford Lives series. Oxford: Oxford University Press, 1987. .

1887 Swedish novels
Novels by August Strindberg
Stockholm archipelago
Novels set in Sweden
Swedish-language novels